Labor Caucus may refer to:

 Australian Labor Party Caucus
  Labor Caucus (United States)